J. Christopher Burch (born March 28, 1953) is the founder and CEO of Burch Creative Capital, a firm based in New York City that manages venture investments and brand development, and co-founder of Tory Burch LLC. He has been an entrepreneur and active investor across fashion, hospitality, and technology industries for nearly forty years. Since establishing his initial venture, Eagle Eye, he has contributed to the rise of multiple brands, including STAUD, BaubleBar, NIHI Sumba, Guggenheim Partners, Tory Burch, Voss Water, Win Brands, Rappi, Danielle Guizio, Solid & Striped, Urbanic, Thursday Boots, SuperOrdinary, Barber Surgeon Guild, Faena Hotel + Universe, Jawbone, Poppin, among many others. 

He became a billionaire in 2012, with Forbes magazine's profile of him in its annual The World's Billionaires stating that the 2012 valuation of Burch's majority stake in C. Wonder pushed his net worth over the ten figure mark.

Early life
Burch was raised in Wayne, Pennsylvania, in a middle-class family. His mother Robin Sinkler, an Episcopalian, was from a Philadelphia Main Line family and his father, John Walter Burch, a Roman Catholic, was one of 10 children born to a middle-class Baltimore family. His father owned a distributor of mining equipment and supplies. Burch attended Tilton School, an independent college preparatory school in Tilton, New Hampshire. He graduated from Tilton in 1972, and later attended Ithaca College.

Career

Fashion industry
In 1976, while an undergraduate at Ithaca College, Burch and his brother Robert started Eagle's Eye apparel with a $2,000 investment, buying sweaters for $10 each and  selling them for $15. Burch decided to find a factory to produce a new brand of "preppy" sweaters so that he could sell them door-to-door on campus. His operation soon expanded to other campuses,  and, eventually, to  retail stores.  Over the next decade, the company expanded to $140 million in sales and a national distribution footprint, including more than 50 of its own retail stores. The company was partially sold to Swire Group, in 1989, and entirely, in 1998 in a deal that valued the brand at $60 million.

In 2004, Burch helped his then wife to launch the Tory Burch fashion label, and served as co-Chairman of the company. He also owned 28.3%, selling half of it in December 2012, as the company was estimated to be worth $3.5 billion. He then established J. Christopher Capital LLC in 2008, later renamed Burch Creative Capital. The company was developed to incubate his new brands and to manage his investments. In 2011, he launched C. Wonder, an apparel, accessories and home decor retailer. In July 2015 the C. Wonder brand was purchased by Xcel Brands.

Real estate
In 2004, Burch partnered with architect Philippe Starck and hotelier Alan Faena to develop the Faena Hotel+Universe in Buenos Aires. The investment into the building, first built in 1902 as a grain storage facility, was in excess of $100 million. In 2014 he once again invested in the real estate developer's projects after purchasing a condo in Faena House, a South Beach development.

In 2005, Burch purchased a luxury home in Southampton, New York for $14 million, and sold the home for $25 million four months later after renovating the property. Burch then founded J.B. Christopher, a supplier of construction materials to real estate developers, in 2006. In 2011, Burch and his partner Austin Hearst completed the development of a $19 million luxury home developments in Nantucket, Massachusetts. In 2012 he acquired a townhouse in the West Village for $11 million after he had been previously renting it. He subsequently undertook a renovation project that was left unfinished before the property was once again put on the market.

In 2013, Burch purchased the Nihiwatu resort on the island of Sumba, a 27 villa estate resort near Bali.

Other investments
In 1993, Burch was a producer for the feature-length romantic comedy film Watch It, directed by Tom Flynn, which received a favorable review from the New York Times. He was   one of the earliest investors in the Internet IPO for Internet Capital Group,  and has made several investments in telecommunications, including Aliph and Powermat. He was also an investor in the online office retailer Poppin. In a partnership with James McBride, he acquired  Nihiwatu Resort on the Indonesian island of Sumba in 2013. After a $30 million investment, the pair opened the resort in 2015 under the name Nihi.  In 2014, he invested in BaubleBar, leading an investment round of $10 million. That year he also partnered with Ellen DeGeneres to launch her lifestyles collection E.D.

Personal life
In 1982, Burch married Susan Cole in an  Episcopal ceremony. They had three children, all daughters: Alexandra "Pookie" (b. 1985), Elizabeth "Izzie" (b. 1986), and Louisa "Weezie" (b. 1989).  In 1996, he married the fashion designer Tory Robinson with whom he had three children, all sons: twins Henry and Nicholas (b. 1997) and Sawyer (b. 2001). They divorced in 2006.

Burch was on the board of the Rothman Institute Orthopedic Foundation. He is a past president of The Pierre Hotel Co-op Board, and a past board member of Guggenheim Partners, and The Continuum Group. In 2013, Burch donated $1.3 million to his alma mater, Tilton School, and was on the school's Board of Trustees from 1982-1985.

References

External links
Burch Creative Capital
Nihiwatu Resort

American venture capitalists
Living people
1953 births
American Episcopalians
American billionaires
Ithaca College alumni
People from Greenwich Village
People from Delaware County, Pennsylvania
People named in the Paradise Papers
Tilton School alumni